Access Bank Group is a financial services conglomerate, headquartered in Nigeria, with subsidiaries in the Democratic Republic of the Congo, Ghana, Kenya, Nigeria, Rwanda, Gambia, Sierra Leone, South Africa, Zambia and the United Kingdom. The group also maintains representative offices in China, India, Lebanon and United Arab Emirates.

In July 2021, the group serviced in excess of 42 million customers in Africa. After the merger of Access Bank plc and Diamond Bank on April 1, 2019, Access Bank plc is today the Africa’s largest bank by customer base, and the largest bank in Nigeria by asset.

Overview
In June 2021, Access Bank Group has published its Q2 (second quarter) report, and has announced a total assets to NGN 10.055 trillion (US$25.513 billion) for the half year ended June 30, 2021.  As of July 2021, the group maintained operational subsidiaries in 9 Sub-Saharan countries and one Western European country. The banking group also has representative offices in four Asian countries, two of which are in the Middle East.

Acquisition of Diamond Bank
In 2018, Access Bank Nigeria, which accounts for approximately 75% of the groups assets, agreed to merge with Diamond Bank, another Nigerian commercial bank that was struggling to maintain regulatory capital ratios. The transaction required regulatory and shareholder approval from both banks. The merger was completed in March 2019. The combined bank retained the name Access Bank Nigeria.

Recent events
On October 24, 2021, Access Bank announced it has entered a binding pact to merge its Zambian unit with African Banking Corporation Zambia Limited in a planned reformation coming barely 9 months after it bought the subsidiary. The agreement confirms Access Bank's will to broaden its presence in the Southern African country to 70 branches and agencies, customer base to 300,0000, and total assets with a value in the neighbourhood of US$1 billion through the combined entity.

On mid-October, Access Bank announced that the group has finalised the acquisition of 78.15% shareholding in the African Banking Corporation of Botswana, otherwise known as BancABC Botswana.

On October 4, 2021, the group has issued a $500 million Eurobond, priced at 9.125%. According to Access Bank Group, this additional Tier one Eurobond which is issued under the bank's medium term note programme is a Basel III compliant Perpetual Non-Call 5.25-year Subordinated Note to be heated on the London Stock Exchange. The Eurobond may be called anytime from October 7, 2026, subject to conditions including the Central Bank of Nigeria’s approval.

History 
The bank was founded in 1988 and incorporated as a private commercial bank in February 1989. It actually began operations on May 11, 1989, establishing its first office located at Burma Road in the Apapa district.

In March 1998, Access Bank changed its legal status and became a public limited company and in the same year, on November 18, entered the Nigeria Stock Exchange.

In 2002, Aigboje Aig-Imoukhuede was appointed managing director and Herbert Wigwe, Deputy Managing Director, with the mandate of raising the bank from 65th place to the top 10 in 2007.

In 2003, Access Bank raised more than NGN 14.5 billion with a public offering, registering a 133% oversubscription. The same year, the bank received the Hewlett Packard Award for the best implementation of a basic banking application (Flexcube 6.2) in West Africa. The following year, Access Bank acquired Capital Bank and Marina Bank through a merger by absorption and integration.

During 2007, Access Bank became the first Nigerian bank to introduce Visa credit cards in Nigeria and achieved EMV certification for the multi-card ATM services platform. It also received funding from the Belgian Fund for Investment Companies for Developing Countries.

Access Bank successfully concluded its 3rd public offering in 2008, raising more than US$1 billion.

In 2009, Access Bank merged with the Intercontinental Commercial Bank (ICB) and was listed the same year (2012) on the LSE (London Stock Exchange). A 350 million dollars Eurobond was also successfully raised in parallel.

During 2018, Access Bank announced its intention to acquire Diamond Bank for US$235 million, which represents a portfolio of 29 million customers. The group also announced a collaboration with 25 global banks to develop the principles of sustainable banking and align the sector with the United Nations sustainable development goals, and the launch of Access WhatsApp Banking. Completion of the merger with Diamond Bank is announced in March 2019.

In March 2021, Access Bank announced the acquisition of a stake in Grobank, a South African bank, for US$60 million.

Expansion plan

In Africa 
In early 2021, Access Bank announced that it had identified eight new African countries for potential expansion, seeking to benefit from a continent-wide free trade agreement. The target markets are Morocco, Algeria, Egypt, Côte d'Ivoire, Senegal, Angola, Namibia and Ethiopia, which would extend the international presence of the bank to 18 countries. Access Bank is expected to establish offices in some countries and in others, should partner with existing banks and leverage its digital platforms to provide services to clients.

In France and Europe 
In July 2021, the French government manifested its will to strengthen its ties with Nigerian captains of industry including Herbert Wigwe, the group managing director of Access Bank, and announced that an agreement had been signed which would allow the group to settle in France. This agreement confirms the group's vision and desire to extend its influence and activities to all of France and gradually to all of Europe.

The opening of Access Bank in Paris will be managed by the group's London branch, headed by Britain's Jamie Simmonds. The new offices in France will focus on trade finance. The Nigerian bank is also considering embarking on investment and wealth management services.

Member companies
The member companies of Access Bank Group include but are not limited to the following:

Location

The headquarters of Access Bank Group were previously located at Plot 999c, Danmole Street, Off Adeola Odeku/Idejo Street, Victoria Island, Lagos, Nigeria.

In February 2020, the headquarters were relocated to Access Tower, 14/15, Prince Alaba Oniru Road, Oniru, Lagos, Nigeria. The geographical coordinates of the banking groups headquarters are: 06°26'00.0"N, 03°26'36.0"E (Latitude: 6.433459, Longitude: 3.445069).

See also

List of banks in Nigeria
Banking in Nigeria

References

External links
 Access Bank to establish more African subsidiaries, Herbert Wigwe eyes Francophone region As of 11 March 2020.

Banks established in 1989
Banks of Nigeria
Multinational companies based in Lagos
Victoria Island, Lagos
Nigerian companies established in 1989
Access Bank Group